Dan Keun Sung (born 19 July 1952) is a South Korean professor of electronic engineering at the Korea Advanced Institute of Science and Technology (KAIST) in Daejeon.

Sung was born in South Gyeongsang Province. He received his B.Sc. in electronic engineering from Seoul National University in 1975 before going on to the University of Texas at Austin, where he received his M.Sc. (1982) and Ph.D. (1986) in electrical and computer engineering. He was named Fellow of the Institute of Electrical and Electronics Engineers (IEEE) in 2015 for contributions to network resource management. He is also a member of the Korean Academy of Science and Technology.

References 

1952 births
Living people
People from South Gyeongsang Province
Seoul National University alumni
Cockrell School of Engineering alumni
Academic staff of KAIST
Fellow Members of the IEEE